Terra do Meio Ecological Station is an ecological station (ESEC) in the state of Pará, Brazil.

Location

It covers parts of the municipalities of Altamira and São Félix do Xingu in the state of Pará.
The station covers parts of the lowlands and the residual plateau of the southern Amazon.
It lies between the Xingu River and its tributary the Iriri River, which runs through the station from south to north.
The Iriri rises in the Serra do Cachimbo and flows for  before joining the Xingu.
The rivers vary greatly in volume depending on the season, and in the dry season include waterfalls, rocks and rapids.

The ESEC borders the  Serra do Pardo National Park to the southeast.
The proposed South Amazon Ecological Corridor would link the ESEC to other protected areas and indigenous territories in the region.

Environment

The Terra do Meio Ecological Station is in the Amazon biome.
During the dry season from May to November there is elevated risk of natural or man-made fires.
Soils are generally poor in nutrients.
76% of the unit is covered by open submontane rainforest with lianas, and 18.4% is covered by open submontane rainforest with emergent canopy. Smaller areas hold dense submontane rainforest with uniform canopy, open submontane rainforest with palm trees and dense alluvial rainforest.

Birds

Migratory birds that pass through the ecological station include osprey (Pandion haliaetus), spotted sandpiper (Actitis macularius), purple martin (Progne subis), sand martin (Riparia riparia) and barn swallow (Hirundo rustica).
Endemic birds include  white-crested guan (Penelope pileata),  red-throated piping guan (Pipile cujubi), dark-winged trumpeter (Psophia viridis), blue-necked jacamar (Galbula cyanicollis), rufous-necked puffbird (Malacoptila rufa), red-necked aracari (Pteroglossus bitorquatus), Gould's toucanet (Selenidera gouldii), Sclater's antwren (Myrmotherula sclateri), band-tailed antbird (Hypocnemoides maculicauda), Amazonian antpitta (Hylopezus berlepschi) and Amazonian barred woodcreeper (Dendrocolaptes certhia).

Conservation

The Terra do Meio Ecological Station was created by decree on 17 February 2005, and is administered by the Chico Mendes Institute for Biodiversity Conservation.
Protected species in the park include the white-cheeked spider monkey (Ateles marginatus).
The ecological station is classed as IUCN protected area category Ia (strict nature reserve).
The purpose is to conserve nature and support scientific research.
The conservation unit is supported by the Amazon Region Protected Areas Program.

The management plan for the ecological station was published on 23 December 2015. 
The authors had to deal with the issue of land speculators, settlers and 15 families of traditional inhabitants.
The traditional families, with their valuable knowledge, were allowed to stay in an "intensive use zone" and were integrated into management of the area.
The objective of the zone was to maintain the natural environment with little human impact, provide places for developing awareness programs, environmental education and research. It allowed for houses, gardens, and limited extraction of resources, mostly for personal use, according to traditional practices.

The ecological station is in a region that contains 12 sustainable use conservation areas and 6 fully protected areas.
The fully protected areas, which cover , are the Amazônia, Jamanxim, Rio Novo and Serra do Pardo national parks, the Nascentes da Serra do Cachimbo Biological Reserve and the Terra do Meio Ecological Station.

Notes

Sources

External links

Ecological stations of Brazil
Protected areas of Pará
Protected areas established in 2005
2005 establishments in Brazil